Kārtika ( Kartik,  Kārtika,  Kārttika,  Kārtak, Maithili: कातिक) is the eighth month of the Hindu calendar, which falls in October and November of the Gregorian calendar. In India's national civil calendar, Kartika is the eighth month of the year, beginning on 23 October and ending on 21 November. 

In most Hindu calendars, Kartika begins with the transit of the Sun into Libra, beginning on 18 October and lasting until 15 November. In the Nepali calendar, which is also the country's official calendar, Kartika is the seventh month of the year, similar to the Maithili and Bengali calendars. In Bengal, Kartika marks the start of the dry season ( Hemôntô). In the solar Tamil calendar, Kārttikai (கார்த்திகை) is the eighth month, corresponding to November/December in the Gregorian calendar. It begins when the sun enters the sign of Scorpio. Many festivals, such as Karthikai Deepam, are celebrated in this month.

Etymology 
The name of the month is derived from the name of a star, Krittika nakshatra.

Festivals
Several major religious holidays take place in Kartika. These are as follows:
 Part of Diwali (amanta tradition): Balipratipada and Govardhan Puja/Annakut (Kartika 1), Bhai Dooj (Kartika 2)
 Diwali (purnimanta tradition), including Govatsa Dwadashi (Kartika 12), Dhanteras (Kartika 13), Naraka Chaturdasi (Kartika 14), Kali Puja and Lakshmi Puja (Kartika 15), Balipratipada and Govardhan Puja/Annakut (Kartika 16), Bhai Dooj (Kartika 17)
 Chhath Mahaparv (Kartika 21)
 Kartik Poornima (Kartika 15 or Kartika 30)
 Sohrai
 Kartika Ekadashi (Kartika 11 or Kartika 26)
 Nag Nathaiya in Varanasi

The festival of Kartik Poornima (Kartika 15/30) falls in this month; it celebrated as Dev Deepavali in Varanasi. This coincides with the nirvana of the Jain Tirthankara Mahavira, the birth of the Sikh Guru Nanak, Guru Nanak Jayanti, and the well-known Ayyappan garland festival for the god of Sabarimalai, which is also known as Tripuri Purnima.

The second day of Kartika's bright fortnight is also called Bhaatri Dwitiyaa (similar to Bhai Dooj). It is celebrated by sisters entertaining their brothers, following the legend of Yamuna, who entertained her brother Yama on the same day.

Nag Nathaiya in Varanasi, which falls on the fourth Tithi of Kartika's bright fortnight, is an ancient festival celebrating the god Krishna's victory of good over evil. Kashi Naresh (the titular king of Varanasi) would view the festivities from his royal boat.

Every Monday and Ekadashi of this month are special and Abhisheka is offered to Lord Shiva on these oocasions. This month is also considered as the most auspicious month in the Hindu calendar.

See also

 Astronomical basis of the Hindu calendar
Hindu units of measurement
 Hindu astronomy
 Jyotisha

References

External links 
 Festivals in Karthika masam 

08
Months of the Bengali calendar